Mohammad Sharifi (born 21 March 2000) is an Iranian professional footballer who plays as a midfielder for Persian Gulf Pro League club Nassaji Mazandaran.

In 2017, Sharifi was chosen by The Guardian as one of the best 60 young talents in world football.

Club career

Esteghlal Khuzestan
Originally Sharifi signed with Saba Qom in the summer of 2016 to work with Ali Daei, however after Daei left the club before the start of the season, the contract was not finalized. Instead, Sharifi signed with Persian Gulf Pro League champions, Esteghlal Khuzestan. 

Sharifi made his professional debut on 24 November 2016 in a 0–0 draw against FC Mashhad, coming on as a second-half substitute. He became one of the youngest ever players to play in the Persian Gulf Pro League.

Saipa
After the end of the 2016–17 season Sharifi left Esteghlal Khuzestan, and in the summer of 2017 he signed a contract with Tehran based club Saipa.

Persepolis 
On 31 October 2020, Sharifi signed a two-year contract with Persian Gulf Pro League champions Persepolis. After signing the contract, he announced: "It is an honour to play for Persepolis".

Career statistics

Club

International career

U-17
Sharifi was a regular call up with the Iran national under-17 football team and was the team captain as Iran finished second in the 2016 AFC U-16 Championship.

Honours

Club 
 Persepolis
Persian Gulf Pro League (1): 2020–21
Iranian Super Cup (1): 2020 ; Runner-up (1): 2021

International 
Iran U16
 AFC U-16 Championship Runner-up (1): 2016

External Link 
Mohammad Sharifi On Instagram

References

External links

2000 births
Living people
Iranian footballers
People from Bushehr
Association football midfielders
Esteghlal Khuzestan F.C. players
Saipa F.C. players
Persepolis F.C. players
Nassaji Mazandaran players
Persian Gulf Pro League players